The Donawerth was an 80-gun Bucentaure-class 80-gun ship of the line of the French Navy, designed by Sané.

In late 1809, Ganteaume was organising reinforcements to Barcelona. The fleet departed Toulon on 24 April 1809, and returned on 1 May without incident.

References
 Jean-Michel Roche, Dictionnaire des Bâtiments de la flotte de guerre française de Colbert à nos jours, tome I

Ships of the line of the French Navy
Ships built in France
Bucentaure-class ships of the line
1808 ships